Syria competed at the 1968 Summer Olympics in Mexico City, Mexico.  It was the first time in 20 years that the nation participated in the Olympic Games.

Competitors
The following is the list of number of competitors in the Games.

Wrestling

Syria nominated 2 wrestlers.

Men's Greco-Roman

References

External links
Official Olympic Reports
Syria at the 1968 Summer Olympics

Nations at the 1968 Summer Olympics
1968
Olympics, Summer